Loyal Opposition: Terror in the White House is an American made-for-television thriller-drama film that aired on The Family Channel on March 8, 1998.

Plot
When a terrorist surfaces, the Chairman of the Joint Chiefs of Staff, General James Metzger (Nick Mancuso) urges President Mark Hayden (Lloyd Bochner) for a military response. However, the President prefers to try negotiating. So, the General takes the President hostage and launches an offensive of his own. The first female Vice President Elizabeth Lane (Joan Van Ark) is the only one who can do something about it and must fight mutineers in the White House to rescue him.

Cast
Joan Van Ark....Vice President Elizabeth Lane
Nick Mancuso.....General James Metzger
Rick Springfield....Senator Barklay
Lloyd Bochner.....President Mark Hayden
Corbin Bernsen.... Secret Service Agent John Gray
Don Diamont.... Secret Service Agent John Vendome
Joel Palmer.... Kevin Lane
Nathaniel DeVeaux.... Scott Davies
Malcolm Stewart.... Admiral Edward Fellows
Bob Morrisey.... Krell
Garvin Cross.... Williams
Eli Gabay.... Hobson
Ken Roberts.... General Erickson
Garry Chalk.... Col. Gardener
Brian Downey.... Ben Harrison

See also

List of action films of the 1990s
 Air Force One (1997)

References

External links

1998 television films
1998 films
ABC Family original films
Films about hostage takings
Films about fictional presidents of the United States
Films set in the White House
Films directed by Mark Sobel
1990s American films